Below is a list of members of the 7th National Assembly of Namibia. They were selected by their parties based on the results of the 2019 parliamentary election. This National Assembly was inaugurated on 20 March 2020. Like each of the previous National Assemblies, it is led by the South West Africa People's Organization. The 7th National Assembly has 104 seats. 96 candidates were elected according to party lists and are assembled below in the order they appear on their party lists.

South West Africa People's Organization (SWAPO)

 Netumbo Nandi-Ndaitwah
 Sophia Shaningwa
 Pohamba Shifeta
 Lucia Iipumbu
 Tom Alweendo
 Saara Kuugongelwa-Amadhila
 Johanna Kandjimi
 Peya Mushelenga
 Alexia Manombe-Ncube
 Calle Schlettwein
 Lucia Witbooi
 Nangolo Mbumba (resigned immediately due to his appointment as Vice-President)
 Christine ǁHoebes
 Erastus Uutoni
 Itah Kandjii-Murangi
 Hamunyera Hambyuka
 Hilma Nicanor
 Stanley Simataa (until March 2020)
 Bernadette Jagger
 John Mutorwa
 Annakleta Sikerete
 Peter Katjavivi
 Margaret Mensah-Williams
 Royal ǀUiǀoǀoo
 Sylvia Makgone
 Kletus Karondo
 Heather Sibungu
 Tobie Aupindi
 Fenni Nanyeni
 Jerry Ekandjo
 Frans Kapofi
 Bertha Dinyando-Nyambe
 Verna Sinimbo
 Hafeni Ndemula
 Veno Kauaria
 Natangwe Ithete
 Anna Nghipondoka
 Vincent Mareka
 Nono Katjiingisua
 Daniel Kashikola
 Agnes Tjongarero
 Leon Jooste
 Juliet Kavetuna
 Mandela Kapere
 Maria Elago
 Modestus Amutse
 Loide Kasingo
 Penda Ya Ndakolo
 Paula Kooper
 Albert Kawana
 Jennely Matundu
 Doreen Sioka
 Leevi Katoma
 Faustina Caley
 Utoni Nujoma
 Kornelia Shilunga
 Tjekero Tweya
 Emilia Amupewa
 Derek Klazen
 Agnes Kafula
 Alpheus !Naruseb
 Anna Shiweda
 Sebastian Karupu
 Maureen Hinda-Mbuende (replacing Nangolo Mbumba)
 Gothard Kasuto (replacing Stanley Simataa)

Popular Democratic Movement (PDM)

 McHenry Venaani
 Jennifer Van den Heever
 Diederik Vries
 Vipuakuje Muharukua
 Nicolaas Smit
 Jan van Wyk
 Elma Dienda
 Esmeralda ǃAebes
 Johannes Martin
 Kazeongere Tjeundo
 Koviao Hengari
 Geoffrey Mwilima
 Elizabeth Becker
 Timotheus Shihumbu
 Winnie Moongo
 Pieter Mostert
 Maximalliant Katjimune

Landless People's Movement (LPM)
 Bernadus Swartbooi
 Henny Seibeb
 Edson Isaacks
 Utaara Mootu

National Unity Democratic Organisation (NUDO)

 Esther Muinjangue
 Josef Kauandenge

All People's Party (APP)

 Ignatius Shixwameni
 Erastus Shuumbwa

United Democratic Front (UDF)

 Apius Auchab
 Themistokles Dudu Murorua

Republican Party (RP)

 Clara Gowases (Until June 2020)
 Mathias Mbundu

Namibian Economic Freedom Fighters (NEFF)

 Epafras Mukwiilongo
 Longinus Iipumbu

Rally for Democracy and Progress (RDP)
 Mike Kavekotora

Christian Democratic Voice (CDV)

 Gotthard Kandume

SWANU

 Tangeni Iiyambo

Members appointed by the president
President Hage Geingob appointed eight additional members without voting rights, seven of them in order to serve as ministers or deputies in Namibia's cabinet:
 Ipumbu Shiimi, Minister of Finance
 Emma Kantema-Gaomas, Deputy Minister of Youth, Sports and Culture
 Veikko Nekundi, Deputy Minister of Works and Transport
 Natalia Goagoses
 Kalumbi Shangula, Minister of Health
 Yvonne Dausab, Minister of Justice
 Peter Vilho, Minister of Defence and Veteran Affairs
 Emma Theofilus, Deputy Minister of Information and Communication Technology

References

7th
2020s in Namibia